Belevitch's theorem is a theorem in electrical network analysis due to the Russo-Belgian mathematician Vitold Belevitch (1921–1999).  The theorem provides a test for a given S-matrix to determine whether or not it can be constructed as a lossless rational two-port network.

Lossless implies that the network contains only inductances and capacitances – no resistances.  Rational (meaning the driving point impedance Z(p) is a rational function of p) implies that the network consists solely of discrete elements (inductors and capacitors only – no distributed elements).

The theorem
For a given S-matrix  of degree ;

where,
d will equate to the number of elements (inductors and capacitors) in the network, if such network exists.

Belevitch's theorem states that,  represents a lossless rational network if and only if,

where,
 is a strict Hurwitz polynomial of degree not exceeding 
 for all .

References

Bibliography
Belevitch, Vitold Classical Network Theory, San Francisco: Holden-Day, 1968 .
Rockmore, Daniel Nahum; Healy, Dennis M. Modern Signal Processing, Cambridge: Cambridge University Press, 2004 .

Circuit theorems
Two-port networks